The 1975 BYU Cougars football team represented Brigham Young University during the 1975 NCAA Division I football season. The Cougars were led by fourth-year head coach LaVell Edwards and played their home games at Cougar Stadium in Provo, Utah. The team competed as a member of the Western Athletic Conference, finishing tied for fourth with a conference record of 4–3.

Schedule

Roster

Game summaries

Air Force

Utah

Gifford Nielsen passed and ran for two touchdowns and Brigham Young's defense turned Utah fumbles into three more scores in the 51-20 rout. Mark Uselman also kicked field goals of 47, 47 and 44 yards as the Cougars won their fourth in a row in the series.

References

BYU
BYU Cougars football seasons
BYU Cougars football